For the Sake of Love is the twelfth studio album by American soul musician Isaac Hayes. The album was released in 1978, by Polydor Records. The album peaked at number 75 on the Billboard 200.

Track listing
All tracks composed by Isaac Hayes; except where indicated

References

1978 albums
Isaac Hayes albums
albums produced by Isaac Hayes
Polydor Records albums